Julián Ezequiel Aude Bernardi (born 24 March 2003) is an Argentine professional footballer who plays as a left-back for Lanús.

Club career
Aude began his footballing career at the age of five with Club Biblioteca Popular Nicolás Avellaneda, a year prior to his arrival at Lanús. Having trained with the senior set-up in December 2019, Aude made the breakthrough into the first-team towards the end of 2020. Luis Zubeldía initially selected him on the substitute's bench on five occasions, three times in the Copa de la Liga Profesional and twice in the Copa Sudamericana. Aude's senior debut soon arrived in the former competition on 29 November 2020 against Talleres, as he featured for the final six minutes of a home win after replacing Facundo Quignon.

International career
In 2018, Aude began representing Argentina at U17 level. After featuring in a friendly against the United States, Aude made six appearances at the 2019 South American U-17 Championship as they won the trophy. He wasn't selected for the subsequent FIFA U-17 World Cup, due to the fact he was recovering from surgery after being diagnosed with knee tendonitis. In 2019, as well as one for the U16s, Aude received a call-up from the U17s for the 2019 Granatkin Memorial; which they won.

Career statistics
.

Honours
Argentina U17
 South American U-17 Championship: 2019
 Granatkin Memorial: 2019

Notes

References

External links

2003 births
Living people
Sportspeople from Lanús
Argentine people of French descent
Argentine footballers
Argentina youth international footballers
Association football defenders
Argentine Primera División players
Club Atlético Lanús footballers